Andreas Tsiatinis (born November 15, 1985, in Nicosia, Cyprus) is a Cypriot basketball player. He measures 198 cm (6 ft 6 in) tall. He is a small forward. He has won the Cyprus League with APOEL.

References 

1985 births
Living people
APOEL B.C. players
Cypriot men's basketball players
Sportspeople from Nicosia
Small forwards